Pauline Carton (4 July 1884 – 17 June 1974) was a French film actress. She appeared in more than 190 films between 1907 and 1974.

Filmography

 La fille du Boche (1915)
 Blanchette (1921)
 La femme de nulle part (1922)
 Château historique (1923) - Tante Chloë
 Mon curé chez les riches (1925)
 Feu Mathias Pascal (1926) - Tante Scholastique
 Le p'tit Parigot (1926) - Tante Prudence
 La tournée Farigoule (1926) - La poétesse
 La petite fonctionnaire (1927) - Madame Lebardin
 Education of a Prince (1927) - La concierge
 La ronde infernale (1928)
 Yvette (1928)
 Miss Édith, duchesse (1929) - Marie
 L'arpète (1929) - La concierge
 My Childish Father (1930) - The Concierge
 Cendrillon de Paris (1930)
 Black and White (1931) - Marie - la bonne
 Montmartre (1931)
 The Voice of Happiness (1931)
 American Love (1931) - Pauline
 The Blood of a Poet (1932)
 Seul (1932) - Mme Frutte
 Mon curé chez les riches (1932) - La bonne
  (1932) - Madame Morin
 Suzanne (1932) - Mme Batonné
 Criminal (1933)
 Âme de clown (1933)
 The Abbot Constantine (1933) - Pauline
 High and Low (1933) - Madame Poschbeim, la couturière
 Bouton d'or (1933)
 Nous ne sommes plus des enfants (1934)
 Les misérables (1934) - La soeur de Gillenormand (uncredited)
 Miquette (1934) - Mlle Poche
 Ces messieurs de la santé (1934) - Mme Génissier
 Little Jacques (1934) - Mademoiselle Julie
 Les hommes de la côte (1934)
 Itto (1934) - Tante Anna
 Ferdinand le noceur (1935) - Mme Paturin
 Une nuit de noces (1935)
 Good Luck (1935) - La mère de Marie
 L'école des cocottes (1935) - Mme Bernoux
 Mademoiselle Mozart (1935) - Annette
 The New Testament (1936) - Mademoiselle Morot
 Le roman d'un jeune homme pauvre (1936) - Mademoiselle Aubry, la parente pauvre
 Taras Bulba (1936) - La gouvernante
 Excursion Train (1936) - La concierge
 Confessions of a Cheat (1936) - Mme. Morlot / The Notary's Wife
 Forty Little Mothers (1936) - Mlle Clotilde
 My Father Was Right (1936) - Marie Ganion - sa servante
 You Are Me (1936) - Honorine Guibert - la tante de Bobby
 Southern Mail (1937) - Mathilde
 The House Opposite (1937) - Aglaé
 Vous n'avez rien à déclarer? (1937) - Angèle
 Les dégourdis de la 11ème (1937) - Hortensia
 The Pearls of the Crown (1937) - Une femme de chambre
 Boissière (1937) - Estelle
 The Citadel of Silence (1937) - La logeuse
 La belle de Montparnasse (1937) - Madame Pontbichot
 Mon deputé et sa femme (1937)
 Gribouille (1937) - L'autre Nathalie Roguin
 La fille de la Madelon (1937) - La marquise de Sérignan
 Les anges noirs (1937) - La servante
 À Venise, une nuit (1937) - La concierge
 Désiré (1937) - Adèle Vazavoir, la cuisinière
 Nights of Princes (1938) - Mademoiselle Mesureux
 Quadrille (1938) - La femme de chambre de l'hôtel
 Monsieur Breloque a disparu (1938)
 Les gaietés de l'exposition (1938) - La logeuse
 Le plus beau gosse de France (1938) - La crémière
 La présidente (1938) - (uncredited)
 Le coeur ébloui (1938) - Madame Morin
 Un fichu métier (1938) - Adrienne
 Paix sur le Rhin (1938) - Anna, la vieille servante
 La marraine du régiment (1938)
 Remontons les Champs-Élysées (1938) - (uncredited)
 Conflict (1938) - Pauline
 Mon oncle et mon curé (1939) - Hortense
 Louise (1939) - La première
 The World Will Shake (1939) - (uncredited)
 La belle revanche (1939) - Mme Bouchot
 Gardons notre sourire (1939) - Florence
 Vous seule que j'aime (1939) - Sidonie Dupont, la directrice du pensionnat
 Ma tante dictateur (1939) - Eugénie - la bonne
 L'étrange nuit de Noël (1939) - Anna
 Nine Bachelors (1939) - Clémentine
 There's No Tomorrow (1939) - La bonne Ernestine
 Narcisse (1940) - (uncredited)
 Sur le plancher des vaches (1940) - Madame Noblesse, la femme de ménage
 Tobias Is an Angel (1940)
 La prière aux étoiles (1941) - Fernande Richaud - la mère de Florence
 L'amant de Bornéo (1942) - Agathe
 La neige sur les pas (1942) - La directrice de la pension de famille
 Six petites filles en blanc (1942)
 The Beautiful Adventure (1942) - Jeantine
 Manouche (1942)
 Marie-Louise (1944) - Frau Gilles / Mrs. Gilles
 La troisième dalle (1946) - Madame Barbaroux
 Les Amants du pont Saint-Jean (1947) - Tante Marguerite
 Third at Heart (1947) - Marguerite
 The Private Life of an Actor (1948) - Elise Belanger
 Blanc comme neige (1948) - Madame Potinel
 L'ombre (1948) - La concierge
 The Lame Devil (1948) - La chiromancienne
 The Cupboard Was Bare (1948) - Mme Ovide
 Marlene (1949) - La vieille dame
 I Like Only You (1949) - Aurélie
 Aux deux colombes (1949) - Angèle - la servante
 Barry (1949) - La mère Culoz
 Ronde de nuit (1949) - La concierge
 Branquignol (1949) - L'astiqueuse de cloches
 Amédée (1950) - Tante Eugénie
 Menace de mort (1950) - Madame Auguste
 Le 84 prend des vacances (1950) - Pauline
 Miquette (1950) - Perrine
 Minne, l'ingénue libertine (1950) - (uncredited)
 Le tampon du capiston (1950) - Hortense Reverchon
 Blonde (1950) - La concierge de Claire
 The Treasure of Cantenac (1950) - Eulalie
 The Prize (1950) - Virginie
 Coeur-sur-Mer (1950) - Apolline Meunier
 Le vrai coupable (1951) - La concierge
 Come Down, Someone Wants You (1951) - Ursule, la bonne
 La Poison (1951) - La mercière
 My Wife Is Formidable (1951) - La concierge
 Au fil des ondes (1951) - Herself
 Je l'ai été trois fois (1952) - Mme. Dutiquesnois, Renneval's assistant
 Monsieur Taxi (1952) - Mathilde - la tante de Lily
 The Girl with the Whip (1952) - La bonne
 The Virtuous Scoundrel (1953) - La patronne de l'hôtel
 The Drunkard (1953) - Mademoisellle Michel - La Punaise
 Carnaval (1953) - Toinette
 Soyez les bienvenus (1953) - Mademoiselle Lulu
 The Porter from Maxim's (1953) - Sophie
 Royal Affairs in Versailles (1954) - La Voisin
 Les deux font la paire (1954) - La concierge
 Fruits of Summer (1955) - Mélanie
 Napoléon (1955) - Une aubergiste
 Pas de souris dans le business (1955) - La concierge
 On déménage le colonel (1955) - La femme du brigadier
 Si Paris nous était conté (1956) - La bouquiniste
 Mon curé chez les pauvres (1956) - Valérie
 Meeting in Paris (1956) - La salutiste (uncredited)
 Ces sacrées vacances (1956) - La propriétaire
 Les insoumises (1956) - Hortense, la bonne
 Les carottes sont cuites (1956)
 Zaza (1956) - Mme. Anaïs
 Lovers and Thieves (1956) - La refoulée
 Baratin (1956) - Blondine
 The Singer from Mexico (1956) - La tante de Cri-Cri
 Ah, quelle équipe! (1957) - La première voisine
 Les 3 font la paire (1957) - Eveline
 Let's Be Daring, Madame (1957) - La chef des choristes
 Fric-frac en dentelles (1957) - Madame Latouche
 Les gaités de l'escadrille (1958) - La bonne du denstiste
 A Dog, a Mouse, and a Sputnik (1958) - Marie
 En bordée (1958) - L'hôtelière
 Life Together (1958) - Madame Vattier
 Vice Squad (1959) - La 'marieuse'
 The Bureaucrats (1959) - Ida Médard âgée (uncredited)
 Vous n'avez rien à déclarer? (1959) - La servante
 Business (1960) - Clotilde
 Interpol Against X (1960) - Louise Belloy
 La fille du torrent (1961) - La bonne
 The Longest Day (1962) - Maid
 Black Humor (1965) - La Rapet - segment 1 'La Bestiole'
 Clodo (1971) - La concierge

References

External links

1884 births
1974 deaths
People from Biarritz
French stage actresses
French film actresses
French silent film actresses
20th-century French actresses